In general relativity, Regge–Wheeler–Zerilli equations are a pair of equations that describes gravitational perturbations of a Schwarzschild black hole, named after Tullio Regge, John Archibald Wheeler and Frank J. Zerilli. The perturbations of a Schwarzchild metric is classified into two types, namely, axial and polar perturbations, a terminology introduced by Subrahmanyan Chandrasekhar. Axial perturbations induce frame dragging by imparting rotations to the black hole and change sign when azimuthal direction is reversed, whereas polar perturbations do not impart rotations and do not change sign under the reversal of azimuthal direction. The equation for axial perturbations is called Regge–Wheeler equation and the equation governing polar perturbations is called Zerilli equation.

The equations take the same form as the one-dimensional Schrödinger equation. The equations read as

where  characterizes the polar perturbations and  the axial perturbations. Here  is the tortoise coordinate (we set ),  belongs to the Schwarzschild coordinates ,  is the Schwarzschild radius and  representing the time-dependence of the perturbations appearing in the form . The Regge–Wheeler potential and Zerilli potential are respectively given by

where  and  characterizes the eigenmode for the  coordinate. For gravitational perturbations, the modes  are irrelevant because they do not evolve with time. The shape of above potentials are exhibited in the figure.

Relations between the two problems
In 1975, Subrahmanyan Chandrasekhar and Steven Detweiler discovered a one-to-one mapping between the two equations, leading to a consequence that the spectrum corresponding to both potentials are identical. The two potentials can also be written as

Reflection and transmission coefficients

The problem is essentially the same as that of a reflection and transmission problem by a potential barrier in quantum mechanics. Let the incident wave with unit amplitude be , then the asymptotic behaviours of the solution are given by

In the second equation, we have imposed the physical requirement that no waves emerge from the event horizon. 

The reflection and transmission coefficients are thus defined as 

subjected to the condition  Because of the inherent connection between the two equations as outlined in the previous section, it turns out

and thus consequently, since  and  differ only in their phases, we get

Quasi-normal modes
Quasi-normal modes correspond to pure tones of the black hole. It describes for arbitrary, but small, perturbations such as an object falling into the black hole, accretion of matter surrounding it, last stage of slightly aspherical collapse etc. The required boundary conditions are

indicating that we have purely outgoing waves with amplitude  and purely ingoing waves at the horizon. 

The problem becomes an eigenvalue problem.

The nonlinear eigenvalue problem is given by

The solution is found to exist only for a discrete set of values of

References

Equations of physics
Astrophysics
General relativity
Ordinary differential equations